Kotani Dam  is a rockfill dam located in Hyogo Prefecture in Japan. The dam is used for water supply. The catchment area of the dam is 2.2 km2. The dam impounds about 72  ha of land when full and can store 16600 thousand cubic meters of water. The construction of the dam was started on 1973 and completed in 2000.

See also
List of dams in Japan

References

Dams in Hyogo Prefecture